Regine or Régine is a feminine given name. Regine is a German-French form of Regina, and Régine is a French form of Regina. 

People with the first name include:

Regine
 Regine Heitzer (born 1944), Austrian figure skater
 Regine Hildebrandt (1941–2001), German biologist and politician
 Regine Mösenlechner (born 1961), German alpine skier
 Regine Olsen (1822–1904), Danish woman who was engaged to the philosopher and theologian Søren Kierkegaard
 Regine Velasquez (born 1970), Filipino singer, actress, record producer, designer and TV host
 Regina Jonas (German: Regine Jonas) (1902–1944), German woman who became the first female rabbi

Régine
 Régine Chassagne (born 1976), Canadian musician and founding member of the band Arcade Fire
 Régine Crespin (1927–2007), French opera soprano
 Régine Deforges (1935–2014), French author, editor, director and playwright
 Régine Pernoud (1909–1998), French historian and medievalist
 Régine Robin (1939–2021), French-Canadian novelist, writer, translator and professor of sociology
 Régine Zylberberg (1929–2022), French singer and nightclub impresario better known as simply Régine

References

Feminine given names